Termiz is a district of Surxondaryo Region in Uzbekistan. It surrounds the city Termez (Termiz), which is not part of the district. Its seat is the town Uchqizil. The district consists of 9 urban-type settlements (Uchqizil, Limonchi, Tajribakor, Namuna, At-Termiziy, Mustaqillik, Pattakesar, Chegarachi, Qizilboy) and 5 rural communities.

References

Districts of Uzbekistan
Surxondaryo Region